Camilla Soardi (active ca. 1540), a gentlewoman of Casale Monferrato in north-west Italy, was a Renaissance poet, identified as a notable female literary figure by her appearance in both the Teatro delle Donne letterate of Della-Chiesa and Marcello Alberti's Storia delle Donne scienziate. Gioseffantonio Morano describes her as a virtuoso with a most subtle genius.

See also
Margarita Balliana and Margarita Bobba, also women poets of sixteenth-century Casale.

Notes

Sources
Gioseffantonio Morano, Catalogo degli illustri scrittori di Casale: e di tutto il ducato di Monferrato e delle opere da' medesimi composte, e date alla luce (Asti: Stamperia del Pila, 1771), p. 93.

People from Casale Monferrato
Italian Renaissance writers
Women writers (Renaissance)
16th-century Italian women writers
16th-century Italian writers
Italian women poets
Year of birth unknown
Year of death unknown